María Dolores Pulido (born 1 October 1974) is a Spanish long-distance runner. She competed in the women's marathon at the 2004 Summer Olympics. She also won the Logroňo Medio Maratón de La Rioja in 2013.

Career

References

External links
 

1974 births
Living people
Athletes (track and field) at the 2004 Summer Olympics
Spanish female long-distance runners
Spanish female marathon runners
Olympic athletes of Spain
Place of birth missing (living people)